Old Norse, Old Nordic, or Old Scandinavian, is a stage of development of North Germanic dialects before their final divergence into separate Nordic languages. Old Norse was spoken by inhabitants of Scandinavia and their overseas settlements and chronologically coincides with the Viking Age, the Christianization of Scandinavia and the consolidation of Scandinavian kingdoms from about the 7th to the 15th centuries.

The Proto-Norse language developed into Old Norse by the 8th century, and Old Norse began to develop into the modern North Germanic languages in the mid-to-late 14th century, ending the language phase known as Old Norse. These dates, however, are not absolute, since written Old Norse is found well into the 15th century.

Old Norse was divided into three dialects: Old West Norse or Old West Nordic (often referred to as Old Norse), Old East Norse or Old East Nordic, and Old Gutnish. Old West Norse and Old East Norse formed a dialect continuum, with no clear geographical boundary between them. For example, Old East Norse traits were found in eastern Norway, although Old Norwegian is classified as Old West Norse, and Old West Norse traits were found in western Sweden. Most speakers spoke Old East Norse in what is present-day Denmark and Sweden. Old Gutnish is sometimes included in the Old East Norse dialect due to geographical associations. It developed its own unique features and shared in changes to both other branches.

The 12th-century Icelandic Gray Goose Laws state that Swedes, Norwegians, Icelanders, and Danes spoke the same language,  ("Danish tongue"; speakers of Old East Norse would have said ). Today Old Norse has developed into the modern North Germanic languages Icelandic, Faroese, Norwegian, Danish, Swedish, and other North Germanic varieties of which Norwegian, Danish and Swedish retain considerable mutual intelligibility while Icelandic remains the closest to Old Norse.

Geographical distribution 

Old Icelandic was very close to Old Norwegian, and together they formed Old West Norse, which was also spoken in Norse settlements in Greenland, the Faroes, Ireland, Scotland, the Isle of Man, northwest England, and in Normandy. Old East Norse was spoken in Denmark, Sweden, Kievan Rus', eastern England, and Danish settlements in Normandy. The Old Gutnish dialect was spoken in Gotland and in various settlements in the East.

In the 11th century, Old Norse was the most widely spoken European language, ranging from Vinland in the West to the Volga River in the East. In Kievan Rus', it survived the longest in Veliky Novgorod, probably lasting into the 13th century there. The age of the Swedish-speaking population of Finland is strongly contested, but Swedish settlement had spread the language into the region by the time of the Second Swedish Crusade in the 13th century at the latest.

Modern descendants 

The modern descendants of the Old West Norse dialect are the West Scandinavian languages of Icelandic, Faroese, Norwegian, and the extinct Norn language of Orkney and Shetland; the descendants of the Old East Norse dialect are the East Scandinavian languages of Danish and Swedish. Norwegian is descended from Old West Norse, but over the centuries it has been heavily influenced by East Norse, particularly during the Denmark–Norway union.

Among these, the grammar of Icelandic and Faroese have changed the least from Old Norse in the last thousand years. In contrast, the pronunciations of both Icelandic and Faroese have changed considerably from Old Norse. With Danish rule of the Faroe Islands, Faroese has also been influenced by Danish.

Both Middle English and Early Scots were strongly influenced by Norse – especially dialects from northern England, within the area of the Danelaw, and Lowland Scots, both of which contained many Old Norse loanwords. Consequently, Modern English (including Scottish English), inherited a significant proportion of its vocabulary directly from Norse.

The development of Norman French was also influenced by Norse. Through Norman, to a smaller extent, so was modern French.

Written modern Icelandic derives from the Old Norse phonemic writing system. Contemporary Icelandic-speakers can read Old Norse, which varies slightly in spelling as well as semantics and word order. However, pronunciation, particularly of the vowel phonemes, has changed at least as much in Icelandic as in the other North Germanic languages.

Faroese retains many similarities but is influenced by Danish, Norwegian, and Gaelic (Scottish and/or Irish). Although Swedish, Danish and Norwegian have diverged the most, they still retain considerable mutual intelligibility. Speakers of modern Swedish, Norwegian and Danish can mostly understand each other without studying their neighboring languages, particularly if speaking slowly. The languages are also sufficiently similar in writing that they can mostly be understood across borders. This could be because these languages have been mutually affected by each other, as well as having a similar development influenced by Middle Low German.

Other influenced languages 
Various languages unrelated to Old Norse and others not closely related have been heavily influenced by Norse, particularly the Norman language; to a lesser extent, Finnish and Estonian. Russian, Ukrainian, Belarusian, Lithuanian and Latvian also have a few Norse loanwords. The words Rus and Russia, according to one theory, may be named after the Rus' people, a Norse tribe, probably from present-day east-central Sweden.

A number of loanwords have been introduced into Irish, many associated with fishing and sailing. A similar influence is found in Scottish Gaelic, with over one hundred loanwords estimated to be in the language, many of which are related to fishing and sailing.

Phonology

Vowels 
The vowel phonemes mostly come in pairs of long and short. The standardized orthography marks the long vowels with an acute accent. In medieval manuscripts, it is often unmarked but sometimes marked with an accent or through gemination.

Old Norse had nasalized versions of all ten vowel places. These occurred as allophones of the vowels before nasal consonants and in places where a nasal had followed it in an older form of the word, before it was absorbed into a neighboring sound. If the nasal was absorbed by a stressed vowel, it would also lengthen the vowel. This nasalization also occurred in the other Germanic languages, but were not retained long. They were noted in the First Grammatical Treatise, and otherwise might have remained unknown. The First Grammarian marked these with a dot above the letter. This notation did not catch on, and would soon be obsolete. Nasal and oral vowels probably merged around the 11th century in most of Old East Norse. However, the distinction still holds in Dalecarlian dialects. The dots in the following vowel table separate the oral from nasal phonemes.

Note: The open or open-mid vowels may be transcribed differently:
  = 
  = 
  = 

This can be determined by their distinction within the 12th-century First Grammatical Treatise but not within the early 13th-century Prose Edda. The nasal vowels, also noted in the First Grammatical Treatise, are assumed to have been lost in most dialects by this time (but notably they are retained in Elfdalian and other dialects of Ovansiljan).

Consonants 
Some accounts have it a voiced velar fricative  in all cases, and others have that realisation only in the middle of words and between vowels (with it otherwise being realised ). The Old East Norse  was an apical consonant, with its precise position is unknown; it is reconstructed as a palatal sibilant. It descended from Proto-Germanic  and eventually developed into , as had already occurred in Old West Norse.

Unlike the three other digraphs, it was retained much longer in all dialects. Without ever developing into a voiceless sonorant in Icelandic, it instead underwent fortition to a plosive , which suggests that instead of being a voiceless sonorant, it retained a stronger frication.

Accent 

Primary stress in Old Norse falls on the word stem, so that  would be pronounced . In compound words, secondary stress falls on the second stem (e.g.).

Orthography 

Unlike Proto-Norse, which was written with the Elder Futhark, runic Old Norse was originally written with the Younger Futhark, which had only 16 letters. Because of the limited number of runes, several runes were used for different sounds, and long and short vowels were not distinguished in writing. Medieval runes came into use some time later.

As for the Latin alphabet, there was no standardized orthography in use in the Middle Ages. Long vowels were sometimes marked with acutes but also sometimes left unmarked or geminated. The standardized Old Norse spelling was created in the 19th century and is, for the most part, phonemic. The most notable deviation is that the nonphonemic difference between the voiced and the voiceless dental fricative is marked. The oldest texts and runic inscriptions use þ exclusively. Long vowels are denoted with acutes. Most other letters are written with the same glyph as the IPA phoneme, except as shown in the table below.

Phonological processes

Ablaut 
Ablaut patterns are groups of vowels which are swapped, or ablauted, in the nucleus of a word. Strong verbs ablaut the lemma's nucleus to derive the past forms of the verb. This parallels English conjugation, where, e.g., the nucleus of sing becomes sang in the past tense and sung in the past participle. Some verbs are derived by ablaut, as the present-in-past verbs do by consequence of being derived from the past tense forms of strong verbs.

Umlaut 

Umlaut or mutation is an assimilatory process acting on vowels preceding a vowel or semivowel of a different vowel backness. In the case of i-umlaut and ʀ-umlaut, this entails a fronting of back vowels, with retention of lip rounding. In the case of u-umlaut, this entails labialization of unrounded vowels. Umlaut is phonemic and in many situations grammatically significant as a side effect of losing the Proto-Germanic morphological suffixes whose vowels created the umlaut allophones.

It appears in words like gøra, from Proto-Germanic *garwijaną, and commonly in verbs with a velar consonant before the suffix like søkkva < *sankwijaną.

OEN often preserves the original value of the vowel directly preceding runic  while OWN receives ʀ-umlaut. Compare runic OEN  with OWN  (later ),  ("glass", "hare", "pile of rocks").

U-umlaut 
U-umlaut is more common in Old West Norse in both phonemic and allophonic positions, while it only occurs sparsely in post-runic Old East Norse and even in runic Old East Norse.

The change from Norse  to Old Swedish  represents only a change in orthography rather than a change in sound. And thus changes from Norse  to Old Swedish  to Swedish  should be viewed as a change in orthography.
  Represents the u-umlaut found in Swedish.

This is still a major difference between Swedish and Faroese and Icelandic today. Plurals of neuters do not have u-umlaut at all in Swedish, but in Faroese and Icelandic they do, for example the Faroese and Icelandic plurals of the word ,  and  respectively, in contrast to the Swedish plural  and numerous other examples. That also applies to almost all feminine nouns, for example the largest feminine noun group, the o-stem nouns (except the Swedish noun  mentioned above), and even i-stem nouns and root nouns, such as Old West Norse  (mörk in Icelandic) in comparison with Modern and Old Swedish .

Breaking 

Vowel breaking, or fracture, caused a front vowel to be split into a semivowel-vowel sequence before a back vowel in the following syllable. While West Norse only broke , East Norse also broke .

Assimilation or elision of inflectional ʀ 
When a noun, pronoun, adjective, or verb has a long vowel or diphthong in the accented syllable and its stem ends in a single l, n, or s, the r (or the elder r- or z-variant ʀ) in an ending is assimilated. When the accented vowel is short, the ending is dropped.

Similarly, the verb  ('to shine') had present tense third person  (rather than); while  ('to cool down') had present tense third person  (rather than).

The clusters  cannot yield  respectively, instead . The effect of this shortening can result in the lack of distinction between some forms of the noun. The nominative singular and nominative and accusative plural would otherwise have been  ,  .

This is observable in the Runic corpus.

Phonotactics

Blocking of ii, uu 
In inflections, this manifested as the dropping of the inflectional vowels.

Epenthesis 
An epenthetic vowel became popular by 1200 in Old Danish, 1250 in Old Swedish and Norwegian, and 1300 in Old Icelandic. An unstressed vowel was used which varied by dialect.

Grammar 
Old Norse was a moderately inflected language with high levels of nominal and verbal inflection. Most of the fused morphemes are retained in modern Icelandic, especially in regard to noun case declensions, whereas modern Norwegian in comparison has moved towards more analytical word structures.

Gender 

Old Norse had three grammatical genders – masculine, feminine and neuter. Adjectives or pronouns referring to a noun must mirror the gender of that noun, so that one says, "" but, "". As in other languages, the grammatical gender of an impersonal noun is generally unrelated to an expected natural gender of that noun.

All neuter words have identical nominative and accusative forms, and all feminine words have identical nominative and accusative plurals.

Morphology 

Nouns, adjectives and pronouns were declined in four grammatical casesnominative, accusative, genitive and dativein singular and plural numbers. Adjectives and pronouns were additionally declined in three grammatical genders. Some pronouns (first and second person) could have dual number in addition to singular and plural.

There were several classes of nouns within each gender. The following is an example of the "strong" inflectional paradigms:

The numerous "weak" noun paradigms had a much higher degree of syncretism between the different cases; i.e. they had fewer forms than the "strong" nouns.

A definite article was realised as a suffix that retained an independent declension; e.g.,  (a troll) –  (the troll),  (a hall) –  (the hall),  (an arm) –  (the arm). This definite article, however, was a separate word and did not become attached to the noun before later stages of the Old Norse period.

Texts 

The earliest inscriptions in Old Norse are runic, from the 8th century. Runes continued to be commonly used until the 15th century and have been recorded to be in use in some form as late as the 19th century in some parts of Sweden. With the conversion to Christianity in the 11th century came the Latin alphabet. The oldest preserved texts in Old Norse in the Latin alphabet date from the middle of the 12th century. Subsequently, Old Norse became the vehicle of a large and varied body of vernacular literature. Most of the surviving literature was written in Iceland. Best known are the Norse sagas, the Icelanders' sagas and the mythological literature, but there also survives a large body of religious literature, translations into Old Norse of courtly romances, classical mythology, and the Old Testament, as well as instructional material, grammatical treatises and a large body of letters and official documents.

Dialects 
Most of the innovations that appeared in Old Norse spread evenly through the Old Norse area.

However, some changes were geographically limited and so created a dialectal difference between Old West Norse and Old East Norse.

As Proto-Norse evolved into Old Norse, in the 8th century, the effects of the umlauts seem to have been very much the same over the whole Old Norse area. But in later dialects of the language a split occurred mainly between west and east as the use of umlauts began to vary. The typical umlauts (for example  from ) were better preserved in the West due to later generalizations in the east where many instances of umlaut were removed (many archaic Eastern texts as well as eastern runic inscriptions however portray the same extent of umlauts as in later Western Old Norse).

All the while, the changes resulting in breaking (for example  from ) were more influential in the East probably once again due to generalizations within the inflectional system. This difference was one of the greatest reasons behind the dialectalization that took place in the 9th and 10th centuries, shaping an Old West Norse dialect in Norway and the Atlantic settlements and an Old East Norse dialect in Denmark and Sweden.

Old West Norse and Old Gutnish did not take part in the monophthongization which changed  into ,  and  into , nor did certain peripheral dialects of Swedish, as seen in modern Ostrobothnian dialects. Another difference was that Old West Norse lost certain combinations of consonants.

Here is a comparison between the two dialects as well as Old Gutnish. It is a transcription from one of the Funbo Runestones in Sweden (U 990) from the eleventh century (translation: 'Veðr and Thane and Gunnar raised this stone after Haursi, their father. God help his spirit'):

The OEN original text above is transliterated according to traditional scholarly methods, wherein u-umlaut is not regarded in runic Old East Norse. Modern studies have shown that the positions where it applies are the same as for runic Old West Norse. An alternative and probably more accurate transliteration would therefore render the text in OEN as such:

Some past participles and other words underwent i-umlaut in Old West Norse but not in Old East Norse dialects. This can also be seen in the Icelandic and Norwegian words sterkur and sterk ("strong"), which in Swedish is stark as in Old Swedish. These differences can also be seen in comparison between Norwegian and Swedish.

Old West Norse 
Old West Norse is by far the best attested variety of Old Norse. The term Old Norse is often used to refer to Old West Norse specifically, in which case the subject of this article receives another name, such as Old Scandinavian. Another designation is Old West Nordic.

The following table illustrates this:

Old West Norse was also characterized by the preservation of u-umlaut, which meant that, for example, Proto-Norse , "tooth", became  and not  as in post-runic Old East Norse; OWN  and runic OEN , while post-runic OEN  "goose".

The earliest body of text appears in runic inscriptions and in poems composed c. 900 by Þjóðólfr of Hvinir (although the poems are not preserved in contemporary sources, but only in much later manuscripts). The earliest manuscripts are from the period 1150–1200 and concern legal, religious and historical matters. During the 12th and 13th centuries, Trøndelag and Western Norway were the most important areas of the Norwegian kingdom and they shaped Old West Norse as an archaic language with a rich set of declensions. In the body of text that has survived into the modern day from until c. 1300, Old West Norse had little dialect variation, and Old Icelandic does not diverge much more than the Old Norwegian dialects do from each other.

Old Norwegian differentiated early from Old Icelandic by the loss of the consonant h in initial position before l, n and r; thus whereas Old Icelandic manuscripts might use the form , "fist", Old Norwegian manuscripts might use .

From the late 13th century, Old Icelandic and Old Norwegian started to diverge more. After c. 1350, the Black Death and following social upheavals seem to have accelerated language changes in Norway. From the late 14th century, the language used in Norway is generally referred to as Middle Norwegian.

Old West Norse underwent a lengthening of initial vowels at some point, especially in Norwegian, so that OWN  became , ONW  > , OIC  > .

Old Icelandic 
In Iceland, initial  before  was lost: compare Icelandic rangur with Danish , OEN . The change is shared with Old Gutnish.

A specifically Icelandic sound, the long, u-umlauted A, spelled  and pronounced , developed around the early 11th century. It was short-lived, being marked in the Grammatical Treatises and remaining until the end of the 12th century. It then merged back into ; as a result, long A is not affected by u-umlaut in Modern Icelandic.

Thus, pre-13th-century  (with ) 'green' became spelled as in modern Icelandic  (with ). The 12th-century Gray Goose Laws manuscripts distinguish the vowels, and so the Codex Regius copy does as well. However, the 13th-century Codex Regius copy of the Poetic Edda probably relied on newer and/or poorer quality sources. Demonstrating either difficulty with or total lack of natural distinction, the manuscripts show separation of the two phonemes in some places, but they frequently confuse the letters chosen to distinguish them in others.

Old Norwegian 

It is debatable whether the  sequences represented a consonant cluster or devoicing.

Orthographic evidence suggests that in a confined dialect of Old Norwegian,  may have been unrounded before  and that u-umlaut was reversed unless the u had been eliminated: ,  > , .

Greenlandic Norse 

This dialect of Old West Norse was spoken by Icelandic colonies in Greenland. When the colonies died out around the 15th century, the dialect went with it.

Text example 

The manuscript, AM 519 a 4to, is dated c. 1280. The facsimile demonstrates the sigla used by scribes to write Old Norse. Many of them were borrowed from Latin. Without familiarity with these abbreviations, the facsimile will be unreadable to many. In addition, reading the manuscript itself requires familiarity with the letterforms of the native script. The abbreviations are expanded in a version with normalized spelling like that of the standard normalization system. Compared to the spelling of the same text in Modern Icelandic, pronunciation has changed greatly, but spelling has changed little since Icelandic orthography was intentionally modelled after Old Norse in the 19th century.

* a printed in uncial. Uncials not encoded separately in Unicode as of this section's writing.

Old East Norse 

Old East Norse or Old East Nordic between 800 and 1100 is called Runic Swedish in Sweden and Runic Danish in Denmark, but for geographical rather than linguistic reasons. Any differences between the two were minute at best during the more ancient stages of this dialect group. Changes had a tendency to occur earlier in the Danish region. Even today many Old Danish changes have still not taken place in modern Swedish. Swedish is therefore the more conservative of the two in both the ancient and the modern languages, sometimes by a profound margin. The language is called "runic" because the body of text appears in runes.

Runic Old East Norse is characteristically conservative in form, especially Swedish (which is still true for modern Swedish compared to Danish). In essence it matches or surpasses the conservatism of post-runic Old West Norse, which in turn is generally more conservative than post-runic Old East Norse. While typically "Eastern" in structure, many later post-runic changes and trademarks of OEN had yet to happen.

The phoneme ʀ, which evolved during the Proto-Norse period from z, was still clearly separated from r in most positions, even when being geminated, while in OWN it had already merged with r.

The Proto-Germanic phoneme  was preserved in initial sounds in Old East Norse (w-), unlike in West Norse where it developed into . It survived in rural Swedish dialects in the provinces of Westro- and North Bothnia, Skåne, Blekinge, Småland, Halland, Västergötland and south of Bohuslän into the 18th, 19th and 20th century. It is still preserved in the Dalecarlian dialects in the province of Dalarna, Sweden, and in Jutlandic dialects in Denmark. The -phoneme did also occur after consonants (kw-, tw-, sw- etc.) in Old East Norse and did so into modern times in said Swedish dialects and in a number of others. Generally, the initial w-sound developed into  in dialects earlier than after consonants where it survived much longer.

In summation, the -sound survived in the East Nordic tongues almost a millennium longer than in the West Norse counterparts, and does still subsist at the present.

Monophthongization of  >  and  >  started in mid-10th-century Denmark.

Vice versa, masculine i-stems with the root ending in either  or  tended to shift the plural ending to that of the ja-stems while OEN kept the original: ,  and  versus OWN drengir,  ("elks") and bekkir (modern Danish drenge, elge, bænke, modern Swedish drängar).

Old Danish 

Until the early 12th century, Old East Norse was very much a uniform dialect. It was in Denmark that the first innovations appeared that would differentiate Old Danish from Old Swedish as these innovations spread north unevenly (unlike the earlier changes that spread more evenly over the East Norse area), creating a series of isoglosses going from Zealand to Svealand.

In Old Danish,  merged with  during the 9th century. From the 11th to 14th centuries, the unstressed vowels -a, -o and -e (standard normalization -a, -u and -i) started to merge into -ə, represented with the letter . This vowel came to be epenthetic, particularly before -ʀ endings. At the same time, the voiceless stop consonants p, t and k became voiced plosives and even fricative consonants.

Moreover, the Danish pitch accent shared with Norwegian and Swedish changed into stød around this time.

Old Swedish 

At the end of the 10th and early 11th century initial h- before l, n and r was still preserved in the middle and northern parts of Sweden, and is sporadically still preserved in some northern dialects as g-, e.g. The Dalecarlian dialects developed independently from Old Swedish and as such can be considered separate languages from Swedish.

Text example 
It is the oldest text written as a manuscript found in Sweden and from the 13th century. It is contemporaneous with most of the Icelandic literature. The text marks the beginning of Old Swedish as a distinct dialect.

Old Gutnish 

Due to Gotland's early isolation from the mainland, many features of Old Norse did not spread from or to the island, and Old Gutnish developed as an entirely separate branch from Old East and West Norse. Breaking was also particularly active in Old Gutnish, leading to e.g.  versus mainland .

Text example 
The  is the longest text surviving from Old Gutnish. It was written in the 13th century and dealt with the early history of the Gotlanders. This part relates to the agreement that the Gotlanders had with the Swedish king sometime before the 9th century:

Relationship to other languages

Relationship to English 

Old English and Old Norse were related languages. It is therefore not surprising that many words in Old Norse look familiar to English speakers; e.g.,  (arm),  (foot),  (land),  (full),  (to hang),  (to stand). This is because both English and Old Norse stem from a Proto-Germanic mother language. In addition, numerous common, everyday Old Norse words were adopted into the Old English language during the Viking Age. A few examples of Old Norse loanwords in modern English are (English/Viking Age Old East Norse), in some cases even displacing their Old English cognates:
 Nouns – anger, bag, bait, band, bark (stem ), birth, dirt, dregs, egg (related to OE. cognate  which became Middle English /), fellow, gap, husband, cake, keel (stem also), kid, knife, law (stem ), leg, link, loan (related to OE. cognate , cf. lend), race (stem ), root (related to OE. cognate , cf. wort), sale, scrap, seat, sister (related to OE. cognate ), skill (/), skin, skirt ( vs. the native English shirt of the same root), sky, slaughter, snare, steak, thrift, tidings, trust, window, wing
 Verbs – are (displacing OE ), blend, call, cast, clip, crawl, cut (possibly from ON ), die, gasp, get, give (/, related to OE. cognate ), glitter, hit, lift, raise, ransack, rid, run (stem , related to OE. cognate ), scare, scrape, seem, sprint, take, thrive, thrust, want
 Adjectives – flat, happy, ill, likely, loose, low, meek, odd, rotten (/), scant, sly, weak, wrong
 Adverbs – thwart/athwart
 Prepositions – till, fro
 Conjunction – though/tho
 Interjection – hail, wassail
 Personal pronoun – they, their, them (for which the Anglo-Saxons said ,)
 Prenominal adjectives – same

In a simple sentence like "They are both weak," the extent of the Old Norse loanwords becomes quite clear (Old East Norse with archaic pronunciation:  while Old English ). The words "they" and "weak" are both borrowed from Old Norse, and the word "both" might also be a borrowing, though this is disputed (cf. German ). While the number of loanwords adopted from the Norse was not as numerous as that of Norman French or Latin, their depth and everyday nature make them a substantial and very important part of everyday English speech as they are part of the very core of the modern English vocabulary.

Tracing the origins of words like "bull" and "Thursday" is more difficult. "Bull" may derive from either Old English  or Old Norse , while "Thursday" may be a borrowing or simply derive from the Old English , which could have been influenced by the Old Norse cognate. The word "are" is from Old English /, which stems back to Proto-Germanic as well as the Old Norse cognates.

Relationship to modern Scandinavian languages

See also 
 Germanic a-mutation
 An Introduction to Old NorseA common textbook on the language
 List of English words of Old Norse origin
 
 Old Norse morphologyThe grammar of the language.
 Old Norse orthographyThe spelling of the language
 Old Norse poetry
 Proto-Norse languageThe Scandinavian dialect of Proto-Germanic that developed into Old Norse

Dialectal information 
 Greenlandic Norse
 History of Danish
 History of Icelandic
 Old Gutnish
 Old Norwegian
 Old Swedish

Citations

General citations

Cleasby-Vigfússon citations

Sources

General sources 

 
 
 
  , "The Menota handbook 2.0"

Dictionaries 

 
 e-text via the Germanic Lexicon Project (germanic-lexicon-project.org)
 e-text adapted from the Germanic Lexicon Project version to work better with mobile devices and with an improved search (old-norse.net)
 
 
 
 scanned document via "Germanic Lexicon Project" (lexicon.ff.cuni.cz)
 e-text via norroen.info
 
 
 
 
 First and Second editions via www.septentrionalia.net

Grammars 

 
 
  (Old West Norse)
  (Old Swedish and Old Gutnish)
  (Old Danish)
  (Old West Norse)
  (Old Norse in the narrow sense, i.e. Old West Norse)
  (Old West Norse)
  (Old West Norse)

Old Norse texts 

 
  , facing translation

Language learning resources 

 
 
 
 alt source via Germanic Lexicon Project (lexicon.ff.cuni.cz)
 e-ext via Project Gutenberg

External links 

 Heimskringla.no, an online collection of Old Norse source material
 Old Norse Online by Todd B. Krause and Jonathan Slocum, free online lessons at the Linguistics Research Center at the University of Texas at Austin
 Video: Old Norse text read with a reconstructed pronunciation and a Modern Icelandic pronunciation, for comparison. With subtitles
 Old Norse sound sample
 Old Norse loans in Old and Middle English, and their legacy in the dialects of England and modern standard English
 Old Norse basic lexicon at the Global Lexicostatistical Database

 
8th-century establishments in Europe
14th-century disestablishments in Europe
Languages attested from the 8th century
Languages extinct in the 14th century
Norse, Old
North Germanic languages